The Klaipėda Castle Jazz Festival has been held annually during June or July in Klaipėda, Lithuania since 1994. It is staged near the ruined Klaipėda Castle.

Major international performers at past festivals have included Maynard Ferguson, Toots Thielemans, Billy Cobham Culture Mix, Mike Mainieri, Victor Bailey, Chico & the Gypsies, Soweto Kinch, Alex Wilson, and Nikki Yeoh, among others. It traditionally features an all-night jam session.

References
 Performers. Klaipeda Jazz Festival - Official website.
 Karina Juodelyte-Moliboga (11 July 2007). Jazzing it up in Lithuania’s ‘New Orleans’. The Baltic Times.

Jazz festivals in Lithuania
1994 establishments in Lithuania
Music in Klaipėda
Music festivals established in 1994
Annual events in Lithuania
Events in Klaipėda
Summer events in Lithuania